Alpha Mike Foxtrot: Rare Tracks 1994–2014 is a compilation album released in November 2014 by the indie rock band Wilco. The album is a 4 disc collection of demos, live recordings, and b-sides that date between 1994 and 2014. Among its contents is the band's earliest released recording, a duet with Syd Straw of the Ernest Tubb song "The T.B. is Whipping Me", which had been recorded for the 1994 compilation Red Hot + Country.

Track listing
Disc 1
Childlike and Evergreen (Demo)
Someone Else's Song (Demo)
Passenger Side (Demo)
Promising - 3:02
The T.B. Is Whipping Me (with Syd Straw)
I Must Be High (Live)
Casino Queen (Live)
Who Were You Thinking Of (Live)
I Am Not Willing (with Syd Straw)
Burned
Blasting Fonda
Thirteen
Don't You Honey Me
The Lonely 1 (White Hen Version)
No More Poetry
Box Full of Letters (Live)
Red-Eyed And Blue (Live)
Forget The Flowers (Live)
Sunken Treasure (Live)
Monday (Demo)

Disc 2
Passenger Side (Live)
Outtasite (Outta Mind) [Live]
I Got You At the End of the Century (Live)
Outta Mind (Outta Site) [Live]
James Alley Blues (with Roger McGuinn) [Live]
At My Window Sad And Lonely (Jeff Tweedy Solo Version)
California Stars (Live)
One Hundred Years From Now
A Shot In The Arm (Remix)
ELT (King Size Demo Version)
Nothing'severgonnastandinmyway (again) [David Kahne Remix]
She's A Jar (Austin Demo Version)
Tried And True
Student Loan
True Love Will Find You In The End
I'm Always In Love (Live)
Via Chicago (Austin Demo Version)
Can't Stand It (Live)
Airline To Heaven (Alternate Version)
Any Major Dude Will Tell You

Disc 3
I'm The Man Who Loves You (Live)
The Good Part
Cars Can't Escape
Camera
Handshake Drugs (First Version)
A Magazine Called Sunset
Bob Dylan's 49th Beard
Woodgrain
More Like The Moon
Let Me Come Home
Old Maid
Hummingbird (Alternate Version)
Spiders (Kidsmoke) [Live]
Hell Is Chrome (Live)
At Least That's What You Said (Live)
The Late Greats (Live)
Just A Kid (with The Blisters)
Kicking Television

Disc 4
Panthers
Theologians (Live)
Another Man's Done Gone (Live)
I'm A Wheel (Live)
How To Fight Loneliness (Live)
One True Vine
The Thanks I Get
Let's Not Get Carried Away
Hate It Here
Impossible Germany (Live)
I Shall Be Released (with Fleet Foxes) [Live]
What Light
Jesus Etc. (with Andrew Bird) [Live]
Glad It's Over
Dark Neon
The Jolly Banker
Unlikely Japan
You And I (Live)
I Love My Label

References

2014 albums
Wilco compilation albums
Nonesuch Records compilation albums
Albums produced by Jeff Tweedy